The 1990-91 Australian Baseball League championship was won by Perth Heat who defeated the Daikyo Dolphins 3–2 in the 5 game championship series.

Ladder

Championship series

Final Series: Game 1: 1st Vs 2nd at Parry Field

Final Series: Game 2: 1st Vs 2nd at Parry Field

Final Series: Game 3: 1st Vs 2nd at Palm Meadows

Final Series: Game 4: 1st Vs 2nd at Palm Meadows

Final Series: Game 5: 1st Vs 2nd at Palm Meadows

Awards

Top Stats

All-Star Team

References

Australian Baseball League (1989–1999) seasons
1990 in Australian baseball
1991 in Australian baseball